Isfjorden is a branch of the great Romsdal Fjord in Rauma Municipality in Møre og Romsdal county, Norway. The Norwegian County Road 64 runs around the whole fjord. The Rauma Line has its terminus at the railway port in the town of Åndalsnes, on the southern coast of the fjord.

History
During the Battle of Kringen in 1612, Scottish forces sailed into the Isfjorden, landed, and then proceeded to march towards the Romsdalen valley.

See also
 List of Norwegian fjords

References

Fjords of Møre og Romsdal
Rauma, Norway